The 1964 St. Louis Cardinals season was the team's 83rd season in St. Louis, Missouri and its 73rd season in the National League. The Cardinals went 93–69 during the season and finished first in the National League, edging the co-runners-up Cincinnati Reds and Philadelphia Phillies by one game each on the last day of the regular-season to claim their first NL pennant since 1946. They went on to win the World Series in 7 games over the New York Yankees.

Offseason
 October 1, 1963: Ken MacKenzie was traded by the Cardinals to the San Francisco Giants for Jimmie Coker.
 December 6, 1963: Carl Sawatski was released by the Cardinals.

Regular season

Exit Musial, enter Brock 
The 1963 team went 93–69. It was the best record for St. Louis since that 1949 team won 96 games. The Cardinals finished six games behind the now-Los Angeles Dodgers.

1964 saw the Cardinals without the best hitter in franchise history. Stan Musial, whose 3,630 career hits were second on the all-time list and remain fourth today, retired after the 1963 season, at the age of 42, after 22 years in St. Louis. His absence left a hole in the Cardinal lineup and in left field, and as the early weeks of the 1964 season passed, St. Louis hovered at the .500 mark. Cardinals GM Bing Devine, worried about both the team and his own job security, looked for a deal to make before the June 15 trading deadline. He consulted with manager Johnny Keane and they decided that the team needed more speed. Keane and Devine focused on Lou Brock, an outfielder with the Chicago Cubs that the Cardinals had scouted years before and who had struggled since coming to the big leagues.

In June, with the trading deadline near and the Cardinals still around .500, Devine made the call to the Cubs and the deal was done. On June 15, St. Louis traded star pitcher Ernie Broglio, who went 18–8 in 1963 and was having another good year in 1964, to Chicago as part of a six-player deal for Brock. Many people thought the Cubs had gotten the better of the deal, including Chicago sportswriters and many Cardinal players. However, Broglio would have a mediocre half-season for the Cubs and then two more ineffective, injury-riddled years in 1965 and 1966 before disappearing from the big leagues forever. Brock hit .348 for the 1964 Cardinals, and as a Cardinal went on to break the all-time record for stolen bases (since broken by Rickey Henderson), amass over 3000 base hits, and go into the Baseball Hall of Fame in 1985.

Busch fires Devine
For most of the 1964 season, the Philadelphia Phillies looked like the team to beat. Philadelphia spent almost the entire first half in first or second place, and in July moved in first place seemingly to stay. The Cardinals, on the other hand, spent much of the season mired in the middle of the pack, and sometimes close to the bottom. As late as June 17, the Cardinals were eighth in a ten-team league, although they were only six back of the lead. Lou Brock joined the team and immediately began to hit but St. Louis still could not dent Philadelphia's lead. The Cardinals called up prized prospect Mike Shannon in early July, and still they stagnated. They were seventh as late as July 24. One problem was first baseman Bill White; the Cardinal slugger, one of the few power hitters on the team, was bothered by a sore shoulder and struggling badly.

On August 16, with the Cardinals at 61–54 and  games out of first place, an impatient Gussie Busch fired general manager Bing Devine. Devine had been GM of the Cardinals since 1957, but would not be around to see how the team he had built would finish. Busch considered firing Keane as well, but held back out of reluctance to further disrupt the team by firing both the manager and GM during the season. Shortly thereafter, however, Busch met with Leo Durocher and made him a verbal offer to manage the Cardinals in 1965. Word soon got out that Keane was a lame duck.

On August 23, the Cardinals fell 11 games behind Philadelphia, tied for the farthest back they'd been all year, although they'd actually improved to fourth place in the overall standings. The Cardinals reeled off a six-game winning streak immediately after falling 11 back and continued to play well in September, but the Phillies seemed to be too far ahead to catch.  On September 20, the Cardinals were tied with Cincinnati for second place,  games behind Philadelphia. A Sports Illustrated article described the Cardinal surge as "far too late".

The "Phillie Phold" and Cardinal comeback
Injuries accumulated for the first-place Phillies as the season wore on. Slugger Frank Thomas broke his thumb. Starting pitcher Ray Culp hurt his elbow and had to go to the bullpen. Starting pitcher Art Mahaffey was slumping badly. Starting pitcher Dennis Bennett was plagued by tendinitis. Philly manager Gene Mauch, in a move that has remained controversial ever since, reacted to his rotation's problems by using star pitchers Jim Bunning and Chris Short on less than normal rest six times down the stretch. Philadelphia lost all six of those games.

Still the Phillies held on to their lead. On September 20, Philadelphia was 90–60 and led the National League by  games with only twelve games to go. A pennant seemed assured. The Phillies even started taking applications for World Series tickets. Then came the infamous "Phillie Phold". The Phold started on September 21, when Philadelphia lost 1–0 to Cincinnati with the only run scoring on a steal of home. The Phils were swept in three games by Cincinnati, who crept to within  games of first place. Then they were swept in four games by Milwaukee. On the 25th the Braves beat Philly in 12 innings. On the 26th they beat Philly by scoring three in the top of the ninth. On the 27th Milwaukee beat the Phils 14–8, extending their losing streak to seven games and dropping them out of first place for the first time in two months. Philadelphia was one game behind Cincinnati, while the Cardinals, who'd gone 6–1 during Philadelphia's streak, were in third place, 1.5 games back. The Phillies were feeling the pressure and making mistakes on the bases; in one fifteen-game stretch, 10 Phillies were thrown out trying to take an extra base.

St. Louis and Philadelphia met for a crucial three-game series starting in St. Louis on September 28. The Cardinals won the first game 5–1, vaulting past Philly into second place, one game behind the idle Reds, with the Phils 1.5 games back.  On the 29th the Cards beat the Phils 4–2 behind a strong start from Sadecki, and Cincinnati lost to visiting Pittsburgh. The Cardinals were in first place for the first time all year, tied with the Reds, with Philly 1.5 games back. On the 30th the Cardinals beat the Phillies again, 8–5, with Curt Simmons beating Bunning. Cincinnati lost to Pittsburgh at home again, and the Cardinals had sole possession of first place. Philadelphia had lost ten in a row and the Cardinals had won eight in a row.

The Cardinals lost 1–0 on October 2 at home to the terrible Mets while the Phillies beat the Reds in Cincinnati to finally snap their losing streak. On the 3rd the Cardinals lost again to the Mets while the Phillies and Reds remained idle. St. Louis and Cincinnati were tied for first place with 92–69 records, while Philadelphia was one game behind at 91–70. On the last day of the season, October 4, the Phillies beat the Reds at Cincinnati again, but the Cardinals beat the visiting Mets 11–5 to win the pennant by one game, with a 93–69 record; if the Cardinals had lost that game, the regular schedule would have ended in a 3-way tie for the pennant. The "Phold" is remembered as one of the worst late-season collapses in baseball history. The Cardinals, having won their first pennant since 1946, would go on to face the mighty Yankees in the World Series.

Season standings

Record vs. opponents

Notable transactions
 April 9, 1964: Gary Kolb and Jimmie Coker were traded by the Cardinals to the Milwaukee Braves for Bob Uecker.
 May 26, 1964: Walt Williams was selected off waivers by the Cardinals from the Houston Colt .45's.
 June 15, 1964: Ernie Broglio, Doug Clemens and Bobby Shantz were traded by the Cardinals to the Chicago Cubs for Lou Brock, Jack Spring, and Paul Toth.
 September 10, 1964: Mike Torrez was signed as an amateur free agent by the Cardinals.

Roster

Player stats

Batting

Starters by position 
Note: Pos = Position; G = Games played; AB = At bats; H = Hits; Avg. = Batting average; HR = Home runs; RBI = Runs batted in

Other batters
Note: G = Games played; AB = At bats; H = Hits; Avg. = Batting average; HR = Home runs; RBI = Runs batted in

Pitching

Starting pitchers
Note: G = Games pitched; IP = Innings pitched; W = Wins; L = Losses; ERA = Earned run average; SO = Strikeouts

Other pitchers
Note: G = Games pitched; IP = Innings pitched; W = Wins; L = Losses; ERA = Earned run average; SO = Strikeouts

Relief pitchers
Note: G = Games pitched; W = Wins; L = Losses; SV = Saves; ERA = Earned run average; SO = Strikeouts

1964 World Series 

Playing in their first Series in eighteen years, and one that resembled a rematch of the two franchises' first encounter in 1926, the upstart "Redbirds" took on the veteran New York Yankees, featuring Ken Boyer's younger brother Clete, also an All-Star third baseman.  Ken Boyer's stunning grand slam home run in Game 4 at Yankee Stadium, along with Gibson's overpowering pitching, was a key in a 4 games to 3 win by the Cardinals – their seventh World Series championship.  This marked the end of the Yankee dynasty that saw 15 pennants in 18 seasons from 1947 to 1964.  The Cardinals are the only one of the original eight National League teams to hold an overall World Series edge against the Yankees, 3 Series to 2.

Before the regular season had ended, both the owners of the Cardinals and the Yankees had decided to replace their managers, Keane and Yogi Berra, after the season – regardless of outcome.  When these two teams happened to meet in the World Series, this plan received a great deal of attention.

Thirty years later, David Halberstam would chronicle the 1964 Cardinals and their World Series opponents the 1964 Yankees in the book October 1964.

After the season
Busch changed his mind about Durocher and attempted to rehire his Series-winning manager, but Keane, angry at the way Busch had treated him and Devine, quit and became manager of the Yankees. Red Schoendienst took over as manager and led the team to two pennants and a championship in 1967 on his way to twelve seasons at the helm.  The Sporting News named Bing Devine Baseball Executive of the Year a few months after he was fired and Keane Manager of the Year.

Awards and honors
 Ken Boyer, National League MVP Award
 Bob Gibson, Babe Ruth Award
 Bob Gibson, World Series Most Valuable Player Award
 Gold Glove Awards
 Curt Flood, outfield
 Bobby Shantz, pitcher
 Bill White, first base

Farm system

References

External links
1964 St. Louis Cardinals at Baseball Reference. Includes box scores, daily schedule, and daily standings.
1964 St. Louis Cardinals team page at www.baseball-almanac.com

Audio: Harry Caray calls the pennant-clinching out on October 4, 1964

St. Louis Cardinals seasons
Saint Louis Cardinals season
National League champion seasons
World Series champion seasons
St Louis